Joaquim Monzó i Gómez, also known as Quim Monzó (born 15 March 1952 in Barcelona, Catalonia, Spain), is a contemporary Spanish writer of novels, short stories and discursive prose, mostly in Catalan. In the early 1970s, Monzó reported from Vietnam, Cambodia, Northern Ireland and East Africa for the Barcelona newspaper Tele/eXpres. He was one of the members of the Catalan literary collective, Ofèlia Dracs. He lives in Barcelona and publishes regularly in La Vanguardia.

His fiction is characterized by an awareness of pop culture and irony.  His other prose maintains this humor. One collection of his essays, Catorze ciutats comptant-hi Brooklyn, is notable for its account of New York City in the days immediately following September 11. In collaboration with Cuca Canals, he wrote the dialogue for Bigas Luna's Jamón, jamón. He has also written El tango de Don Joan, with Jérôme Savary.

In 2007 he wrote and read the opening speech at the Frankfurt Book Fair, the year in which Catalan culture was the guest. Monzó designed an acclaimed lecture written as if it were a short story, thus differing completely from a traditional speech. From December 2009 to April 2010 there took place in the Arts Santa Mònica Gallery in Barcelona a great retrospective exhibition on his life and his work, called Monzó.

Bibliography

Books in English 
 O'Clock, 1986. New York: Ballantine Books. Translated by Mary Ann Newman.  
 The enormity of the tragedy, 2007. London: Peter Owen Publishers. Translated by Peter Bush.  
 Gasoline, 2010. Rochester, NY: Open Letter. Translated by Mary Ann Newman. ; 
 Guadalajara, 2011, Rochester, NY: Open Letter. Translated by Peter Bush. ; 
 A thousand morons, 2013, Rochester, NY: Open Letter. Translated by Peter Bush. ; 
 Why, Why, Why?, 2019, Rochester, NY: Open Letter. Translated by Peter Bush. ;

Books in Catalan

Fiction 
 L'udol del griso al caire de les clavegueres, 1976. Winner of the Premi Prudenci Bertrana (1976).
 Self Service, 1977. In collaboration with Biel Mesquida.
 Uf, va dir ell, 1978.
 Olivetti, Moulinex, Chaffoteaux et Maury, 1980. Winner of the Premi de la Crítica Serra d'Or in 1981.
 Benzina, 1983.
 L'illa de Maians, 1985. Awarded the Premi de la Crítica Serra d'Or, 1986.
 La magnitud de la tragèdia, 1989. Winner of the Premi de Novel·la El Temps, 1989.

 El perquè de tot plegat, 1993. Awarded the Premi Ciutat de Barcelona in 1993, and the Premi de la Crítica Serra d'Or in 1994.
 Guadalajara, 1996. Awarded the Premi de la Crítica Serra d'Or, 1997.
 Vuitanta-sis contes (comprising Uf, va dir ell, Olivetti, Moulinex, Chaffoteaux et Maury, L'illa de Maians, El perquè de tot plegat and Guadalajara), 1999. Awarded the Premi Nacional de Literatura and Premi Lletra d'Or, both in 2000.
 El millor dels mons, 2001.
 Mil cretins, 2007. Awarded the Maria Àngels Anglada Prize, 2008.

Collected articles and essays 
 El dia del senyor, 1984.
 Zzzzzzzz, 1987.
 La maleta turca, 1990.
 Hotel Intercontinental, 1991.
 No plantaré cap arbre, 1994.
 Del tot indefens davant dels hostils imperis alienígenes, 1998.
 Tot és mentida, 2000.
 El tema del tema, 2003.
 Catorze ciutats comptant-hi Brooklyn, 2004.
 Esplendor i glòria de la Internacional Papanates, 2010.
 Taula i barra. Diccionari de menjar i beure, 2017.

Miscellany
He has also translated a large number of authors, including Truman Capote, J.D. Salinger, Ray Bradbury, Thomas Hardy, Harvey Fierstein, Ernest Hemingway, John Barth, Roald Dahl, Mary Shelley, Javier Tomeo, Arthur Miller, and Eric Bogosian.

Monzó has been diagnosed with Tourette syndrome.

Books about Monzó
Margarida Casacuberta and Marina Gustà (ed.): De Rusiñol a Monzó: humor i literatura. Barcelona: Publicacions de l'Abadia de Montserrat, 1996, 
Christian Camps and Jordi Gàlvez (ed.): Quim Monzó. Montpellier: Université Paul Valéry, 1998.  LO
 Antoni Mestres: Humor i persuasió: l’obra periodística de Quim Monzó. Alicante: Universitat d'Alacant, 2006. 
Julià Guillamon (ed.): Monzó. Com triomfar a la vida. Barcelona: Galàxia Gutenberg / Cercle de Lectors, 2009, . This is a book catalog published on the occasion of the exhibition devoted to the life and work of author (Arts Santa Mònica, Barcelona, between December 2009 and April 2010).

References

External links

Website dedicated to Monzó 
Quim Monzó al the Association of Catalan Language Writers. In 
Short stories by Monzó in Words without Borders 
Open Letter Publishing House 
Peter Owen Publishers on The enormity of the tragedy 
More than twenty-five years of essays by Monzó in the Barcelonian newspaper La Vanguardia 

Opening speech at the 2007 Frankfurt Book Fair 
 
Profile in Culturcat
Web dedicated to the book Monzó. Com triomfar a la vida 
Editorial Anagrama 
Editorial Acantilado 
Quaderns Crema 

Catalan-language writers
Spanish journalists
Journalists from Catalonia
Translators from Catalonia
English–Catalan translators
English–Spanish translators
Spanish–Catalan translators
English-language writers from Catalonia
Translators of Ray Bradbury
Radio personalities from Catalonia
20th-century Spanish novelists
Novelists from Catalonia
21st-century Spanish novelists
Short story writers from Catalonia
People with Tourette syndrome
Writers from Barcelona
1952 births
Living people
Spanish male novelists
20th-century Spanish male writers
21st-century Spanish male writers